The Dewey City Historic District is a  historic district in Thomasville, Georgia which was listed on the National Register of Historic Places in 2008.  It is an intact historically African-American neighborhood.

It then included 110 contributing buildings, a structure, and a contributing site. It also included 100 non-contributing buildings and 35 non-contributing sites, and a non-contributing object.

References

External links

Historic districts on the National Register of Historic Places in Georgia (U.S. state)
International style architecture in Georgia (U.S. state)
National Register of Historic Places in Thomas County, Georgia